The 2016 Trofeo Angelo Caffi was the first edition of the Trofeo Angelo Caffi run at the 2016 Bologna Motor Show. The event featured cars and teams from the NASCAR Whelen Euro Series duelling at a temporary racetrack. The event was won by Alberto Cola who had no previous experience in the car.

Entry List

Qualifying
Results:

Race

References

NASCAR Whelen Euro Series
Trofeo Angelo Caffi